The Firestone Grand Prix of St. Petersburg is an IndyCar Series race held in St. Petersburg, Florida. In most years since 2009, the race has served as the season opener (or at minimum, the first race held on U.S. soil). The race is held annually in the spring, with the exception of 2020, when it was postponed until October due to the COVID-19 pandemic.

The race takes place on a temporary course, utilizing downtown streets, and one runway of Albert Whitted Airport. The event dates back to 1985, with IndyCars first competing in 2003.

History
The inaugural 1985 event was organized by William T. McVey, president of the McBri Corporation in Tampa and a member of IMSA and the SCCA. The SCCA Trans-Am Series held a race on a St. Petersburg downtown waterfront circuit from 1985 to 1990. Can-Am also competed in 1985. Local residents and businesses complained about noise, and the event was eventually put on hiatus. Driver Jim Fitzgerald was killed in a crash during the 1987 race.

From 1996 to 1997, the St. Petersburg race was revived on a different course around Tropicana Field (about one mile west of the original waterfront course). Along with the Trans-Am Series, support races included U.S. FF2000, World Challenge, Pro SRF and Barber Dodge. The event subsequently went again on hiatus for several years.

In 2003, the event was revived again for the Champ Car World Series. A new, modified version of the original 1985 waterfront circuit was created.

For 2004, the event was cancelled due to a dispute between the promoters, furthermore, the bankruptcy and liquidation of the CART series into the new Champ Car World Series saw a shakeup of the calendar. When the race returned in 2005, it switched to the IndyCar Series, marking the first non-oval event for the Indy Racing League. In 2007, the race weekend was expanded to include an American Le Mans Series event.

Andretti Green Promotions would later take over promotion of the event. Starting in 2014, Firestone took over as title sponsor.

Past winners

2008: Race shortened as a result of inclement weather at the start forcing the race to start on Lap 10 after nine Safety Car laps.  Shortened by ESPN under time limit.
2010: Race postponed from March 28 due to inclement weather.
2020: Race postponed from March 15 to October 25 and shortened to 100 laps due to the COVID-19 pandemic.
2021: Race postponed from March 7 to April 25 due to the COVID-19 pandemic.
UAK = Universal Aero Kit
CAK = Chevrolet Aero Kit
HAK = Honda Aero Kit

Support series past winners

Road to Indy presented by Cooper Tire

Atlantic Championship

American Le Mans Series

Overall winner in bold.

Stadium Super Trucks

SCCA Trans-Am

Can-Am
1985 Lou Sell

SCCA Super Vee
1986 Didier Theys
1987 Dave Kudrave
1988 Bernard Jourdain
1989 Stuart Crow
1990 Chris Smith

Course

The Streets of St. Petersburg course is a street circuit connecting existing roads with one of the two runways of Albert Whitted Airport in St. Petersburg, Florida. It also dips into the parking lot at Al Lang Stadium. St. Petersburg is classified as an FIA Grade Two circuit.

First bayfront course
The original 1985 Trans-Am course utilized a similar layout to the course used today. For the first year the track actually ran out to the pier, made a 180 degree turn and returned.  At the end of Bayshore Drive, rather than diverting off to the airport runways, the course circled around 5th Avenue Southeast around Bayfront Arena, and the start/finish line was located just south of the paddock (the parking lot of Bayfront Arena). In addition, the old course traveled further up Beach Drive Northeast, all the way to 5th Avenue Northeast. 5th Ave. NE was a very narrow segment. The course came south down Bayshore Drive Northeast, and passed by The Pier.

Tropicana Field course
The second course at Tropicana Field was located about a mile west of the waterfront location. The circuit used the roads around the perimeter of the parking lot of the stadium.

Second Bayfront course

When the course was reconfigured, the northbound segment turned at Central Avenue instead, and did not go as far as The Pier. The pits and main straight were moved to the airport, and a purpose-built paddock area was paved next to the runway. The Albert Whitted Park was reconfigured/relocated, and the entire course layout was repaved.

The pits and paddock areas, as well as link from Dan Wheldon Way to the airport runway (turns 11, 12, and 13) were constructed specifically for the circuit in 2003, and are considered permanent features of the otherwise temporary circuit.

After the crash at the 2011 Izod IndyCar World Championship that killed Snell Isle resident Dan Wheldon, who won the 2005 race and two Indianapolis 500 titles, the straight following Turn 10 (the turn from Bayshore Drive to Albert Whitted Park) was renamed "Dan Wheldon Way" in his memory.  The sign and commemorative plaque was unveiled by St. Petersburg mayor Bill Foster on March 6, 2012.  A permanent Dan Wheldon Memorial is located next to the Dali Museum on the opposite side of Turn 10, where race winners have their names placed on the memorial.

Lap Records

The official race lap records at the Grand Prix of St. Petersburg are listed as:

Race summaries
2005: The first ever road course race for the Indy Racing League saw Andretti Green Racing win the pole and sweep the top four position. Dan Wheldon finished first, with Tony Kanaan second.
2006: Dario Franchitti won the pole, but was knocked out early due to mechanical failure. The race finished under the yellow flag after Tomas Scheckter and Buddy Rice hit the barrier with 4 laps to go. Roberto Moreno replaced Ed Carpenter for this race as Ed recovered from his injury's but finished 18th due to steering issues. Hélio Castroneves was the winner.
2007: Pole winner Hélio Castroneves led 95 of the 100 laps, holding off Scott Dixon for the win by 0.6007 seconds, the closest finish on a road circuit in IRL history at the time. On the first lap, five cars were involved in a spin, including Tony Kanaan. In practice, Kanaan had crashed his qualified car, but the team made repairs so he could start in the 6th position rather than using a backup. The spin dropped him to the rear of the field. After a series of pit stops under yellow, Dan Wheldon took the lead. On a lap 35 restart, Castroneves bumped Wheldon from behind, and slipped by to take the lead for good. In the best run by a Foyt team in a few season, Darren Manning ran as high as third until a late spin dropped him to 13th. After the first lap spin, Tony Kanaan recovered to finish third.
2008: Heavy rain in the morning soaked the track, and left considerable standing water. The race was started under 10 laps of caution as the track dried. At the start, Tony Kanaan assumed the lead, but soon was passed by Justin Wilson. The early part of the race saw several spins by several cars, including Danica Patrick, Marco Andretti and Mario Moraes. On the 37th lap after a restart, rookie Graham Rahal was hit from behind by Will Power while running 3rd. He was able to continue. Several cautions slowed the race, including a crash by Ryan Briscoe, and a multi-car incident involving Vítor Meira, Franck Perera, and Townsend Bell. On the restart that followed, Rahal-Letterman Racing driver Ryan Hunter-Reay led Graham Rahal. Rahal got the jump and took the lead into the first turn. With time running out before the two-hour time limit, the race was poised to end before the scheduled distance. On the final restart, just under 4 minutes of racing remained. Rahal held off a charging Hélio Castroneves and won his first race. At 19 years, 93 days old, Rahal became the youngest driver ever to win an Indy-style race, as well as the youngest winner in IndyCar Series history. He broke Marco Andretti's record from 2006. He also became the fourth driver to win an IndyCar Series race in his first start, joining Buzz Calkins, Juan Pablo Montoya and Scott Dixon.
2009: On the opening lap, polesitter Graham Rahal was involved in light contact with Tony Kanaan, which damaged his nosecone, and dropped him deep in the standings. With 20 laps to go, defending IndyCar champion Scott Dixon crashed out after contact with Hideki Mutoh. With 14 laps to go, Ryan Briscoe took the lead from Justin Wilson on a restart. Briscoe held off Ryan Hunter-Reay to secure the victory.
2011: The first race featuring the new double-file restarts takes a toll on the field as drivers adjust. On the first lap, a big collision involving several cars saw Marco Andretti flip over in turn 1, a crash he blamed on Hélio Castroneves. Several other drivers experienced contact on restarts, thinning the field. Dario Franchitti stayed in front for most of the race and won the season opener. Simona de Silvestro garnered the most attention of the later stages of the race, as she hotly challenged Tony Kanaan. Kanaan, who had landed his ride with KV Racing just days earlier, held her off over the final few laps for a surprising third-place finish.
2012: Hélio Castroneves won the season-opening event, snapping a winless streak that dates back to Motegi in 2010. It was the first race for the new Dallara DW-12 chassis, and the new turbocharged engine package. Castroneves' victory marked the first win by Chevrolet in the IndyCar Series since 2005. It also marked the first race since the fatal accident of Dan Wheldon. Will Power took the lead from the pole position at the start, but during the first yellow, he ducked into the pits in order to gamble on a fuel strategy. The strategy backfired, and Power was not a factor during the remainder of the race. During the final sequence of pit stops, Castroneves and Scott Dixon were running 1st–2nd. Dixon pitted first on lap 72, and Castroneves pitted on lap later. As the rest of the leaders shuffled through their final pits stops, Castroneves made a bold pass of Dixon on the outside of turn 1 for second place. After the sequence of pit stops was over, Castroneves led the final 26 laps to claim the victory. On his victory lap, Castroneves stopped in turn 10, climbed from his car, and performed his customary "Spider-Man" celebration, climbing the catch fence. He climbed the fence which displayed the street sign "Dan Wheldon Way," which had been designated days earlier by the city of St. Petersburg in the memory of Wheldon.
2013: James Hinchcliffe won the first IndyCar race of his career, taking the lead from Hélio Castroneves on a restart on lap 85 of 110. Hinchcliffe held off Castroneves by 1.09 seconds, with Marco Andretti finishing third, passing Simona de Silvestro for the position on the final lap. Will Power dominated the early parts of the race, but dropped to 16th at the finish after contact with J. R. Hildebrand. Dario Franchitti finished last after an early crash, and defending series champion Ryan Hunter-Reay dropped out with mechanical problems.
2014: Takuma Sato sat on the pole, but he lost the lead at lap 30 to Will Power. On a restart on lap 82, leader Will Power was bringing the field back to green when an "accordion effect" saw the field check-up on the main stretch. Marco Andretti and rookie Jack Hawksworth made contact and crashed into the inside barrier. Power led the most laps, and held off Ryan Hunter-Reay and Hélio Castroneves for the victory. Polesitter Takuma Sato finished 6th.
2015: The season opener at St. Petersburg was also the debut of unique aero kits for Honda and Chevrolet. Apprehension amongst the teams going into the race revolved around the complex, elaborate, and seemingly fragile front wings, and the lack of adequate replacement parts. The concerns were not unfounded, as dozens of on-track contacts throughout the field damaged countless wing components. Will Power won the pole position, leading a Team Penske sweep of the first four positions on the grid. Power took the lead at the start, and led 75 laps. During the final round of pit stops, Juan Pablo Montoya grabbed the lead after he managed a quicker pit stop than Power. In the closing laps, Power chased down Montoya, and narrowed the gap to less than a second with 11 laps to go. Power tried to pass Montoya for the lead in turn 10, but the two cars touched, damaging Power's front wing. Montoya held the lead, and went on to win, his first road course victory in IndyCar racing since 1999.
2016: Team Penske driver Will Power qualified for the pole, but was diagnosed with a concussion shortly after the conclusion of the session and was forced to miss the race. Oriol Servià filled in place of Power. Second place qualifier Simon Pagenaud inherited the pole position. Pagenaud led the opening 48 laps before being passed by his teammate Juan Pablo Montoya. Montoya would lead 44 laps en route to his second win in a row at St. Petersburg. Rookie driver Conor Daly also led 15 laps during the race due to pit strategy, but was shuffled outside the top 10 by the end of the race. The race was slowed by only two yellows. The first came on lap 46 when Luca Filippi and Marco Andretti made contact in the first turn. The second came on the restart from the prior caution when Carlos Muñoz made contact with Graham Rahal in turn four, creating a logjam that completely blocked the race course. After the race, Will Power was reevaluated and deemed not to have a concussion, but instead to be suffering from a lingering ear infection. Power would be cleared to race for the following round at Phoenix International Raceway.
2017: Sébastien Bourdais crashed during qualifying on his out lap, and was relegated to starting 21st and last. Bourdais charged from last to first, the first win for Dale Coyne Racing since 2014. On lap 20, the first round of green flag pit stops began, with several drivers further down the order, including Sébastien Bourdais and Simon Pagenaud, being some of the first in. However, the race's second full-course caution came out in the middle of this pit sequence on lap 26, when Tony Kanaan and Mikhail Aleshin made contact in turn 4, littering the track with debris. The caution forced the top seven drivers in the race to pit during the caution and lose large amounts of track positions. Following the pit stops, Pagenaud, Bourdais and Marco Andretti were running 1st-2nd-3rd. Bourdais got by Pagenaud on lap 37, and began to pull away. After the second and third rounds of pit stops, Bourdais emerged with a 10-second lead, and comfortably cruised to victory over Pagenaud and Scott Dixon.
2020: In a season shortened by the COVID-19 pandemic, the new Roger Penske led IndyCar was forced to move the St. Petersburg Grand Prix from the season opener to the season finale. The race proved to be a championship deciding showdown between Scott Dixon and Josef Newgarden, the latter of which won the 2019 race and the former never having won at St. Petersburg. Dixon had to finish eighth or better to win the championship, while Newgarden had to both win the race and finish at least nine positions better than Dixon to clinch the championship. Although Penske's Will Power qualified for a record ninth pole at St. Petersburg it was Andretti Autosport's Alexander Rossi who led most of the race before he suffered an unforced error and crashed into the walls. In the final stint Newgarden managed to pass Pato O'Ward for the race lead, forcing the normally calm Dixon to drive aggressively into third position and finish there to win his sixth IndyCar championship. 
2021: St. Petersburg returned in 2021 to its more traditional early season slot but was instead placed as the second race of the season rather than the season opener. Throughout the weekend Andretti Autosport's Colton Herta proved to be the fastest driver and ended up dominating the race, winning from pole position. Behind him Penske drivers Josef Newgarden and Simon Pagenaud edged out Jack Harvey of Meyer Shank Racing to round out the podium.
2022: For the first time in two years the St. Petersburg GP returned to its seasoning opening slot. The Grand Prix was hosted on the 27th of February, the earliest date the Grand Prix has ever been hosted and the earliest season start date for the IndyCar Series. The starting grid was also the largest in the history of the event with twenty six entries, including twenty five full time cars and drivers. Team Penske's second year driver and former Supercars champion Scott McLaughlin out qualified Romain Grosjean, Simon Pagenaud, Will Power, Colton Herta, and Rinus VeeKay for the pole position, his first in IndyCar. McLaughlin used a two stop fuel saving strategy to lead most of the race, his strategy holding up even through a yellow caused on lap 26 by rookie David Malukas. In the closing laps 2021 champion Alex Palou, who used the same strategy as McLaughlin, began to hunt McLaughlin down for the lead. McLaughlin beat Palou's attempt at an overcut in the final series of pit stops and conserved enough push to pass to use it to both hold off Palou and work through traffic to take his first IndyCar win. Palou would finish in second place, his best finish on a street circuit. Will Power would round out the podium in third place.
2023: St. Petersburg again saw a record setting of entries in the Grand Prix, with 27 full time entries. Romain Grosjean qualified on pole. A first lap five car pileup threw an early red flag before racing resumed. At lap 36 Scott McLaughlin over cut Grosjean for the lead. McLaughlin held on through another series of cautions before being caught up in an incident on lap 78 between himself and Grosjean, ending Grosjean's race and putting himself a lap down. Pato O'Ward cycled to the front and led the closing laps before an overboost issue with three laps to go caused him to lose control, handing the lead to reigning Indianapolis 500 winner Marcus Ericsson. Ericsson held on to win the incident filled race, which saw almost half the field retire due to crashes. O'Ward and Scott Dixon finished second and third respectively.

Notes

Works cited
Honda Grand Prix of St. Petersburg's website
City has had false starts with racing
St. Petersburg course layouts maps via TheRacingLine.net
Florida State Fairgrounds course map via TheRacingLine.net

References

External links 
 
 Map and circuit history at RacingCircuits.info

 
Recurring sporting events established in 1985
1985 establishments in Florida